Alessandro Parisi (born 15 April 1977) is an Italian footballer who played as a left-back.

Club career
Parisi initially played for the Sicilian clubs Palermo, Trapani, and Messina for 8 seasons. He also played 5 seasons on the Italian peninsula. He scored 14 goals in Serie B for Messina in the 2003–04 season. He made his Serie A debut the following season, on 12 September 2004, against Parma F.C. He remained with the club until the conclusion of the 2007–08 Serie B season.

International career
Parisi made his international debut and only appearance for Italy on 17 November 2004, starting in a 1–0 friendly victory over Finland in Messina.

References

External links
http://www.gazzetta.it/speciali/serie_b/2008_nw/giocatori/1272.shtml
https://web.archive.org/web/20110524040118/http://www.figc.it/nazionali/DettaglioConvocato?codiceConvocato=2852&squadra=1

1977 births
Living people
Italian footballers
Italy international footballers
Palermo F.C. players
A.C. Reggiana 1919 players
U.S. Triestina Calcio 1918 players
A.C.R. Messina players
S.S.C. Bari players
Torino F.C. players
Serie A players
Serie B players
Association football fullbacks
Footballers from Palermo